The 2016–17 season is Beitar Jerusalem 80th season since its establishment in 1936, and 69th since the establishment of the State of Israel. During the 2016–17 campaign the club have competed in the Israeli Premier League, State Cup, Toto Cup,  UEFA Europa League.

Current squad

Transfers

Summer

In:

Out:

Pre-season and friendlies

Competitions

Ligat Ha'Al

Results

League table

Top playoff

Top playoff table

UEFA Europe League

First qualifying round

Second qualifying round

Third qualifying round

Play-off round

State Cup

Toto Cup

Group C

References

Beitar Jerusalem F.C. seasons
Beitar Jerusalem